Jazzland may refer to:

 Jazzland (amusement park), an amusement park later known as Six Flags New Orleans
 Jazzland Records (American record label), a subsidiary of US-based Riverside Records founded in 1960
 Jazzland Recordings, a Norwegian record company founded in 1997
 Jazzland (film), an American film of 1928 starring Florence Turner